Kyle Brown may refer to:
Kyle Brown (Canadian soldier), convicted of a role in the death in custody of a Somalian captive
Kyle Brown (soccer) (born 1983), American soccer player
Kyle Brown (rugby union) (born 1987), South African rugby union sevens player
Kyle Brown (cricketer) (born 1973), New Zealand cricketer
Kyle Brown (computer scientist) (born 1967), American Computer Scientist